This is a list of municipalities in Croatia which have standing links to local communities in other countries known as "town twinning" (usually in Europe) or "sister cities" (usually in the rest of the world).

B
Barban
 Brda, Slovenia

Beli Manastir

 Cambridge, United States
 Mohács, Hungary

Benkovac

 Chorvátsky Grob, Slovakia
 Jarovce (Bratislava), Slovakia

Biograd na Moru

 Felsőnyék, Hungary
 Kressbronn am Bodensee, Germany
 Kyjov, Czech Republic
 Moravske Toplice, Slovenia
 Porto San Giorgio, Italy
 Radlje ob Dravi, Slovenia
 Stará Ľubovňa, Slovakia
 Stolac, Bosnia and Herzegovina
 Székesfehérvár, Hungary
 Tolfa, Italy
 Tomislavgrad, Bosnia and Herzegovina
 Villamagna, Italy

Bjelovar

 Ascoli Piceno Province, Italy
 Rubiera, Italy
 Tomislavgrad, Bosnia and Herzegovina
 Visoko, Bosnia and Herzegovina

C
Čakovec

 Blagoevgrad, Bulgaria
 Kiryat Tiv'on, Israel
 Nagykanizsa, Hungary
 Płońsk, Poland
 Schramberg, Germany
 Szigetvár, Hungary

Čazma
 Hévíz, Hungary

Crikvenica

 Harkány, Hungary
 Kidričevo, Slovenia
 Orlová, Czech Republic
 Saint-Dié-des-Vosges, France
 Verbania, Italy

D
Đakovo

 Kirchenthumbach, Germany
 Malgersdorf, Germany
 Ravne na Koroškem, Slovenia
 Tomislavgrad, Bosnia and Herzegovina

Daruvar

 Letohrad, Czech Republic
 Prague 15 (Prague), Czech Republic
 Siófok, Hungary

Donja Stubica
 Rodgau, Germany

Donji Miholjac
 Siklós, Hungary

Dubrovnik

 Bad Homburg vor der Höhe, Germany
 Beyoğlu, Turkey
 Graz, Austria
 Helsingborg, Sweden
 Monterey, United States
 Ragusa, Italy
 Ravenna Province, Italy 
 Rueil-Malmaison, France
 Sanya, China

 Venezia, Italy

Duga Resa
 Črnomelj, Slovenia

G
Garešnica

 Balatonlelle, Hungary
 Orašje, Bosnia and Herzegovina

Gospić

 Kupres, Bosnia and Herzegovina
 Ružomberok, Slovakia
 Sieradz, Poland

J
Jastrebarsko

 Sungurlare, Bulgaria
 Trenčianska Teplá, Slovakia

Jelsa
 Sankt Andrä, Austria

K
Karlovac

 Alessandria, Italy
 Erzsébetváros (Budapest), Hungary
 Kansas City, United States
 Kragujevac, Serbia

Kaštela

 Bardejov, Slovakia
 Hradec Králové, Czech Republic
 Kiseljak, Bosnia and Herzegovina
 Kupres, Bosnia and Herzegovina
 Lindlar, Germany
 Pszczyna, Poland

 Yountville, United States

Knin

 Shkodër, Albania
 Tomislavgrad, Bosnia and Herzegovina

Kolan
 Starše, Slovenia

Koprivnica

 Arilje, Serbia
 Čapljina, Bosnia and Herzegovina
 Domžale, Slovenia

 Kaposvár, Hungary
 Nikšić, Montenegro

Križevci

 Čitluk, Bosnia and Herzegovina
 Kočani, North Macedonia
 Nagyatád, Hungary
 Reana del Rojale, Italy
 Slovenske Konjice, Slovenia

L
Labin

 Baja, Hungary
 Banovići, Bosnia and Herzegovina
 Carbonia, Italy
 Idrija, Slovenia
 Manzano, Italy
 Rybnik, Poland
 Sandnes, Norway
 Sospirolo, Italy

Lipik

 Abano Terme, Italy
 Birštonas, Lithuania
 Coucy-le-Château-Auffrique, France
 Drohobych, Ukraine
 Igal, Hungary
 Neustadt an der Aisch, Germany

Lovran

 Bleiburg, Austria
 Castel San Pietro Terme, Italy
 Hurbanovo, Slovakia
 Rákosmente (Budapest), Hungary

M
Makarska

 Budva, Montenegro
 Kavadarci, North Macedonia
 Olomouc, Czech Republic
 Stari Grad (Sarajevo), Bosnia and Herzegovina
 Travnik, Bosnia and Herzegovina

Matulji

 Brda, Slovenia
 Castel San Pietro Terme, Italy

Medulin

 Cerklje na Gorenjskem, Slovenia
 Gmünd, Austria
 Marcali, Hungary
 Montecarotto, Italy
 Pöls-Oberkurzheim, Austria
 Porto Tolle, Italy

Motovun
 Chrudim, Czech Republic

N
Našice
 Zlaté Moravce, Slovakia

Nin

 Łubowo, Poland
 Nová Baňa, Slovakia
 Pestszentlőrinc-Pestszentimre (Budapest), Hungary
 Tomislavgrad, Bosnia and Herzegovina

Novalja
 Abenberg, Germany

Novigrad

 La Réole, France
 Sacile, Italy

Novska

 Tomislavgrad, Bosnia and Herzegovina
 Le Touvet, France

O
Ogulin

 Dombóvár, Hungary
 Gignac, France

Omiš

 Havířov, Czech Republic
 Nepomuk, Czech Republic
 San Felice del Molise, Italy

 Zagorje ob Savi, Slovenia

Opatija

 Bad Ischl, Austria
 Balatonfüred, Hungary
 Carmagnola, Italy
 Castel San Pietro Terme, Italy
 Ilirska Bistrica, Slovenia
 Kołobrzeg, Poland

Orahovica

 Bačka Topola, Serbia
 Orfű, Hungary

Osijek

 Budapest XIII (Budapest), Hungary
 Canada Bay, Australia
 Elbasan, Albania
 Huanggang, China
 Lausanne, Switzerland
 Maribor, Slovenia
 Mostar, Bosnia and Herzegovina
 Nitra, Slovakia
 Pécs, Hungary
 Pforzheim, Germany
 Ploieşti, Romania
 Prizren, Kosovo
 Subotica, Serbia
 Tuzla, Bosnia and Herzegovina
 Vicenza, Italy

Otočac
 Nova Gorica, Slovenia

P
Pag

 Carbonera, Italy
 Kozármisleny, Hungary
 Mukachevo, Ukraine
 Slavkov u Brna, Czech Republic
 Szigetvár, Hungary
 Zanè, Italy

Pakrac

 Budva, Montenegro
 Dolný Kubín, Slovakia
 Jasenová, Slovakia
 Postřekov, Czech Republic
 Revúca, Slovakia

Petrinja
 Piotrków Trybunalski, Poland

Ploče
 Ljubljana, Slovenia

Podstrana

 Murska Sobota, Slovenia

Poreč

 Massa Lombarda, Italy
 Monselice, Italy
 Poing, Germany
 Prague 6 (Prague), Czech Republic
 Segrate, Italy
 Siófok, Hungary

Pula

 Budaörs, Hungary
 Graz, Austria
 Hekinan, Japan
 Imola, Italy
 Katowice, Poland
 Kranj, Slovenia

 Novorossiysk, Russia
 Sarajevo, Bosnia and Herzegovina
 Szeged, Hungary
 Trier, Germany
 Uzhhorod, Ukraine
 Verona, Italy
 Villefranche-de-Rouergue, France

R
Rab

 City of San Marino, San Marino
 Kočevje, Slovenia
 Königsbrunn, Germany
 Montegiardino, San Marino
 Sežana, Slovenia

Rijeka

 Bitola, North Macedonia
 Burgas, Bulgaria
 Cetinje, Montenegro
 Csepel (Budapest), Hungary
 Este, Italy
 Faenza, Italy
 Genoa, Italy
 Kawasaki, Japan
 Ljubljana, Slovenia
 Neuss, Germany
 Qingdao, China
 Rostock, Germany
 Trieste, Italy

Rovinj is a member of the Douzelage, a town twinning association of towns across the European Union. Rovinj also has three other twin towns.

Douzelage
 Agros, Cyprus
 Altea, Spain
 Asikkala, Finland
 Bad Kötzting, Germany
 Bellagio, Italy
 Bundoran, Ireland
 Chojna, Poland
 Granville, France
 Holstebro, Denmark
 Houffalize, Belgium
 Judenburg, Austria
 Kőszeg, Hungary
 Marsaskala, Malta
 Meerssen, Netherlands
 Niederanven, Luxembourg
 Oxelösund, Sweden
 Preveza, Greece
 Rokiškis, Lithuania
 Sesimbra, Portugal
 Sherborne, England, United Kingdom
 Sigulda, Latvia
 Siret, Romania
 Škofja Loka, Slovenia
 Sušice, Czech Republic
 Tryavna, Bulgaria
 Türi, Estonia
 Zvolen, Slovakia
Other
 Adria, Italy
 Camaiore, Italy
 Leonberg, Germany

S
Samobor

 Chassieu, France
 Parabiago, Italy

 Veles, North Macedonia
 Wirges, Germany

Selca

 Jasenovo, Slovakia
 Revúca, Slovakia
 Zázrivá, Slovakia

Semeljci

 Bisingen, Germany
 Szemely, Hungary

Senj

 Kőszeg, Hungary
 Parndorf, Austria
 Senec, Slovakia
 Sorbiers, France
 Vratimov, Czech Republic

Šibenik

 Civitanova Marche, Italy
 Herford (district), Germany
 Humenné, Slovakia
 Muggia, Italy
 San Benedetto del Tronto, Italy

 Voiron, France

Sisak

 Celje, Slovenia
 Gabrovo, Bulgaria 
 Heidenheim an der Brenz, Germany
 Remchingen, Germany
 Zeytinburnu, Turkey

Slatina
 Szigetvár, Hungary

Slavonski Brod
 Celje, Slovenia

Slunj

 Castel San Giovanni, Italy
 Grude, Bosnia and Herzegovina

Solin
 Tomislavgrad, Bosnia and Herzegovina

Split

 Ancona, Italy
 Antofagasta, Chile
 Beit Shemesh, Israel
 Charlottenburg-Wilmersdorf (Berlin), Germany
 Cockburn, Australia
 Dover, England, United Kingdom
 Gladsaxe, Denmark
 Hangzhou, China
 Los Angeles, United States
 Mostar, Bosnia and Herzegovina
 Odesa, Ukraine
 Ostrava, Czech Republic
 Rzeszów, Poland
 Štip, North Macedonia
 Trondheim, Norway
 Velenje, Slovenia

Stari Grad

 Bohinj, Slovenia
 Kunštát, Czech Republic
 Letovice, Czech Republic
 Paros, Greece
 Szentendre, Hungary
 Velke Opatovice, Czech Republic
 Zagorje ob Savi, Slovenia

Sveti Filip i Jakov
 Mohács, Hungary

Sveti Martin na Muri

 Busko-Zdrój, Poland
 Szigetszentmiklós, Hungary

T
Tisno is a member of the Charter of European Rural Communities, a town twinning association across the European Union. Tisno also has one other twin town.

Charter of European Rural Communities
 Bienvenida, Spain
 Bièvre, Belgium
 Bucine, Italy
 Cashel, Ireland
 Cissé, France
 Desborough, England, United Kingdom
 Esch (Haaren), Netherlands
 Hepstedt, Germany
 Ibănești, Romania
 Kandava (Tukums), Latvia
 Kannus, Finland
 Kolindros, Greece
 Lassee, Austria
 Medzev, Slovakia
 Moravče, Slovenia
 Næstved, Denmark
 Nagycenk, Hungary
 Nadur, Malta
 Ockelbo, Sweden
 Pano Lefkara, Cyprus
 Põlva, Estonia
 Samuel (Soure), Portugal
 Slivo Pole, Bulgaria
 Starý Poddvorov, Czech Republic
 Strzyżów, Poland
 Troisvierges, Luxembourg
 Žagarė (Joniškis), Lithuania
Other
 Velké Meziříčí, Czech Republic

Trogir

 Bakhchysarai, Ukraine
 Hajdúböszörmény, Hungary
 Harkány, Hungary
 Kotor, Montenegro
 Kranjska Gora, Slovenia
 Kraśnik, Poland
 Montesilvano, Italy
 Porto Sant'Elpidio, Italy
 Prague 5 (Prague), Czech Republic
 Ruse, Bulgaria
 Sarlat-la-Canéda, France
 Słupca, Poland
 Tione di Trento, Italy
 Tivat, Montenegro
 Újbuda (Budapest), Hungary
 Uzhhorod, Ukraine
 Vaterstetten, Germany
 Yalova, Turkey

V
Valpovo

 Biała Rawska, Poland
 Komló, Hungary
 Kupres, Bosnia and Herzegovina

Varaždin

 Bad Radkersburg, Austria
 Koblenz, Germany
 Montale, Italy
 Ptuj, Slovenia
 Ravensburg, Germany
 Schaffhausen, Switzerland
 Trnava, Slovakia

 Zalaegerszeg, Hungary

Varaždinske Toplice
 Piešťany, Slovakia

Vela Luka
 Anacortes, United States

Vinkovci

 Camponogara, Italy
 Kenzingen, Germany
 Kőbánya (Budapest), Hungary
 Ohrid, North Macedonia
 Široki Brijeg, Bosnia and Herzegovina

Virovitica

 Barcs, Hungary
 Jajce, Bosnia and Herzegovina
 Traunreut, Germany
 Vyškov, Czech Republic

Vis
 Piran, Slovenia

Vrbovec

 Kispest (Budapest), Hungary
 Périers, France

Vrgorac

 Reșița, Romania
 Vsetín, Czech Republic

Vukovar

 Bač, Serbia
 Bački Petrovac, Serbia
 Mostar, Bosnia and Herzegovina
 Odžak, Bosnia and Herzegovina
 Partizánske, Slovakia

Z
Zabok

 Puconci, Slovenia
 Sanmenxia, China

Zadar

 Ancona, Italy
 Banská Bystrica, Slovakia
 Dundee, Scotland, United Kingdom
 Fürstenfeldbruck, Germany
 Iquique, Chile
 Milwaukee, United States
 Padua, Italy
 Reggio Emilia, Italy
 Romans-sur-Isère, France
 Székesfehérvár, Hungary
 Terézváros (Budapest), Hungary

Zagreb

 Ankara, Turkey
 Bologna, Italy
 Budapest, Hungary
 Kyoto, Japan
 Ljubljana, Slovenia
 Mainz, Germany
 Molise, Italy
 Pécs, Hungary
 Pittsburgh, United States
 Pristina, Kosovo
 Saint Petersburg, Russia
 Shanghai, China
 Skopje, North Macedonia
 Sofia, Bulgaria
 Tromsø, Norway
 Xiangyang, China

References

Croatia
Lists of populated places in Croatia
Foreign relations of Croatia
Cities and towns in Croatia